Epworth is an unincorporated community in Shelby County, in the U.S. state of Missouri.

History
A post office called Epworth was established in 1891, and remained in operation until 1935. The community was named after a local Methodist church, which in turn was named after Epworth, Lincolnshire, an important place in Methodism.

References

Unincorporated communities in Shelby County, Missouri
Unincorporated communities in Missouri